Colver is a surname. Notable people with the surname include:

Edward Colver (born 1949), American photographer
Jim Colver (born 1958), American politician
Nathaniel Colver (1794–1870), American Baptist clergyman
R. Belle Colver (1882–1977), American writer and journalist
Samuel Colver (1817–1891), Oregon pioneer
William Byron Colver (1870–1926), chairman of the Federal Trade Commission

fr:Colver